The SANFL Women's League Best and Fairest Medal is awarded to the best and fairest player in the SANFL Women's League (SANFL) during the home-and-away season, as determined by votes cast by the officiating field umpires after each game. Future  and  player Courtney Gum was the inaugural winner of the award in 2017, with Lauren Young the youngest winner of the award after her win in 2021, aged just 15 years in her winning season.

Criteria
Umpires cast their votes for each game independent of eligibility criteria of the players; i.e. umpires can cast votes for players who have already been suspended during that season if they perceive them to be amongst the best on the ground.

Winners

See also

 Magarey Medal
 AFL Women's best and fairest

References

External links
 

Best and fairest
Women's Australian rules football awards
Lists of women's Australian rules footballers